The 2020 Turkmenistan Cup was the 27th season of the Turkmenistan Cup knockout tournament. The cup winner qualifies for the 2021 AFC Cup. The draw of the tournament was held on 13 July 2020. The competition started on 27 October 2020 and finished in December 2020.

Bracket
The eight teams of the 2020 Ýokary Liga entered the competition.

Quarter-finals

First legs
First legs will be played on 27 and 28 October 2020.

Second legs

Second legs will be played on 6 and 7 November 2020

Semi-finals

First legs
First legs were played on 1 December 2020.

Second legs
Second legs will be played on 5 December 2020.

Final

External links
Official website of TFF
Sport at Turkmenportal.com

References

Turkmenistan Cup
Turkmenistan
Turkmenistan Cup